The Battle of Saumur was a battle during the Vendee Revolt.  It occurred in the town of Saumur on 11 June 1793.

As at the battle of Thouars, the Republican prisoners were released after swearing not to fight again in the Vendée and having had their hair shaved off so they could be recognised lest they went back on their word and were recaptured.  In the prison at Saumur, the Vendéens found general Pierre Quétineau who had been taken prisoner after his defeat at Thouars.  General Lescure, knowing that his defeated opponent was under threat of a sentence of death from the revolutionary court, proposed to the republican general to remain among the royalists but not have to fight for them.  Pierre Quétineau refused out of conviction, realising that even if he was safe the revolutionary court could instead punish his family if he was seen to be siding with the counter-revolutionaries, and returned to republican territory.  There he was arrested and condemned to death for being defeated, as later was his wife.

Shortly after this battle, Cathelineau was elected generalisimo of the Catholic and Royal Army.

Sources

 Saumur jadis

Battles involving France
Conflicts in 1793
Battles of the War in the Vendée
Battles in Pays de la Loire
History of Maine-et-Loire
1793 in France